Thirunageswaram is a panchayat town in Thanjavur district in the Indian state of Tamil Nadu. Thirunageswaram is located 6 km east of Kumbakonam. It is the suburban region of business city of Kumbakonam.

Thirunageswaram is one of the many temple towns in the state which is named after the grooves, clusters or forests dominated by a particular variety of a tree or shrub and the same variety of tree or shrub sheltering the presiding deity. The region is believed to have been covered with Chamapaka forest and hence called Chamapakavanam.

Demographics
 India census, Thirunageswaram had a population of 9,814. Males constitute 49% of the population and females 51%. Thirunageswaram has an average literacy rate of 72%, higher than the national average of 59.5%: male literacy is 79%, and female literacy is 65%. In Thirunageswaram, 11% of the population is under 6 years of age.

Coconut and Mango farms are also found in abundance.

Temples at Thirunageswaram
There are two major temples at Thirunageswaram. One of them is the famous Vaishnavite temple of Oppliyappan (Oppliyappan Sannadhi), the other the Thiru Nageswarar or Naganatha Swami temple for Shaivites.

Oppliyappan Sannadhi
Oppiliappan temple attracts pilgrims throughout the year. Ramanavami is celebrated every year in a grand manner in the months of April/May. Thirukalyanam and Kanakibishekam are the two important events in Ramanavami festival. This temple food is always done without salt in any food. No one should ever take anything that contains salt into this temple.

Naganatha Swami temple
Tirunageswaram Naganathar Temple (Naga in Tamil/Sanskrit means Snake and Natha means God) is a temple dedicated to Shiva. An important feature of Naganatha Swami temple is that of Rahu bhagawan (one of the nine celestial bodies) sannathi. It is the 29th in the series of Tevara Stalams located south of the river Kaveri. Here milk abhishekam is performed daily during Rahukaalam. At this time, the milk that is poured on the statue turns blue when it passes over the body and once again to white after it reaches the floor. This wonder is watched by many daily during the Raahu Kaalam. This is also the only place wherein one can view Rahu bhagawan with his consorts. The mythological serpents Aadi Seshan, Dakshan and Kaarkotakan worshipped Shiva here. Nala worshipped Shiva here too. Gautama Maharishi, Parashara and Bhageerata are also associated with this temple.

Business 
Weaving Silk sarees is the main business of this small town and Tourist and Divine peoples are the second income for this town

Education 
Government Higher Secondary School.
Rajamani Matriculation School.
Tiruvalluvur Primary School.
Aided middle school, Sannapuram.
Primary School.
Government Primary School Anthamangalam .

Politics 
Tirunageswaram assembly constituency is part of Mayiladuturai (Lok Sabha constituency).
Present MP - Mr. S.RAMALINGAM (DMK)

Present MLA  - Mr. Anbazhagan (DMK) 

Present 

Present Vice President - Mrs. Udaya Uppili(DMK).
Thirunageswaram has totally 15 wards.

References

Cities and towns in Thanjavur district